The 2010 MTV Europe Music Awards took place on 7 November 2010 at Caja Mágica in Madrid, Spain. The awards ceremony was presented by Eva Longoria and Justin Bieber was the official MTV EMA 2010 digital host. Nominations were announced on 20 September. Lady Gaga topped the list of nominations with ten, followed by Katy Perry with five, Eminem with four and Thirty Seconds to Mars & Muse with three apiece.

Thirty Seconds to Mars took the stage at the pre-show featuring surprise guest Kanye West at the Puerta de Alcalá. Shakira opened the show with "Loca", featuring Dizzee Rascal, and the official song of the 2010 FIFA World Cup, "Waka Waka". Performances by Katy Perry and Linkin Park were featured live from outdoor stage at Madrid's Puerta de Alcalá.

Nominations 
Winners are in bold text.

Regional nominations
Winners are in bold text.

Performances

Digital show
Katy Perry — "California Gurls" / "I Kissed a Girl" / "Peacock" / "Hot n Cold" / "Teenage Dream"
Thirty Seconds to Mars — "Closer to the Edge"

Pre show
Thirty Seconds to Mars (featuring Kanye West) — "Hurricane / Power"

Main show
Shakira (featuring Dizzee Rascal) — "Loca" / "Waka Waka (This Time for Africa)"
Kings of Leon — "Radioactive"
Katy Perry — "Firework"
Rihanna — "Only Girl (In the World)"
Kid Rock — "Born Free"
Linkin Park — "Waiting for the End"
B.o.B (featuring Hayley Williams) — "Airplanes"
Miley Cyrus — "Who Owns My Heart"
Plan B — "She Said"
Kesha — "Tik Tok"
Bon Jovi — "What Do You Got?" / "You Give Love a Bad Name" / "It's My Life"

Appearances 
Tim Kash — Red carpet host
Taylor Momsen — presented Best New Act
DJ Pauly D and Snooki — presented Best Pop
Johnny Knoxville — presented Best Alternative
Kelly Brook and David Bisbal — presented Best Video
Emily Osment — presented Best Male
Slash — presented Best Live Act
The Dudesons — presented Best Hip-Hop
Alaska and Joaquín Reyes — presented Best Spanish Act
Thirty Seconds to Mars — presented Free Your Mind
Miley Cyrus — presented Best Rock
Dizzee Rascal — presented Best Female
The Jackass Cast — presented Best Song

Notable incidents
During her acceptance speech for Best New Artist, Kesha directly addressed her fans, saying: "Hopefully I can inspire you to give your finger to the cynics and fucking be yourself!"
Further controversy was raised by the cast of Jackass; when presenting the award, Jason "Wee-Man" Acuña removed his trousers to expose his fully nude lower body, displaying his genitals.  It was not censored.

See also
2010 MTV Video Music Awards

References

External links
MTV Europe Music Awards Official show site

2010
2010 music awards
2010 in Spanish music
Culture in Madrid
2010 in Madrid
November 2010 events in Europe